The Kafin Zaki Dam is a controversial project to build a reservoir on the Jama'are River (also called the Bunga River in its upper reaches) in Bauchi State in the Northeast of Nigeria.

Proposed dam and reservoir

The proposed dam would be of zoned earthfill construction and would be 11 kilometres-long. It would be designed with the potential to install a 15 MW hydroelectric plant. The reservoir would have a storage capacity of 2,700 million cubic meters, and would be the second largest in Nigeria after the Kainji Dam. It would irrigate 120,000 hectares of arable land on which cash crops could be grown. Potentially the project would support production of one million tonnes of sugarcane annually and provide over one million jobs in industries related to agriculture.

Project history

The dam was first considered after the 1972-1974 drought in the Sahel, and during the Shehu Shagari regime in 1979-1982 a contract was awarded to Julius Berger Nigeria to build the dam. In 1984 the contract was terminated, but it was reinstated in 1992 by the Ibrahim Babangida regime. In 1994 the Sani Abacha regime terminated the contract again, and set up a judicial committee of inquiry into all aspects of the project. In 2002, funding was allocated for the project, but then abruptly withdrawn.

In 2008 Governor Isa Yuguda of Bauchi State awarded a contract to the Dangote Group to restart the abandoned dam project, a move that was supported by Abdul Ahmed Ningi, a Bauchi state representative who was House Leader in the National Assembly when the project was cancelled in 2002.

Controversy

Arguments in favor of the dam from supporters in Bauchi State include the benefits of irrigation for agriculture in the area, such as sugar cane crops, while controlled releases would avoid downstream impact. Opponents in downstream Yobe State and Borno State argue that the dam will prevent the seasonal floods that their farmers depend upon for farming, and will cause the water table to drop, with much water being lost to evaporation. Environmentalists are also concerned about the impact on downstream wetlands.

Floodplain farmers and fishermen use water much more efficiently than farmers who rely on irrigation from dams. A study funded by the United Nations Environment Programme (UNEP) estimated that the economic value of water in the downstream Hadejia-Jama'are floodplain was US$32.00 per 1,000 m3, while the value of water in the Kano River Project, irrigated by the Tiga Dam and the Challawa Gorge Dam was US$1.73 per 1,000 m3, or US$0.04 per 1,000 m3 after accounting for operational costs. The study estimated that if implemented, even with a regulated flooding regime to reduce downstream impact, the Kafin Zaki dam project would have negative value of around US$15 million.

In April 2009 Dr. Hassan Bidliya, Administrative Secretary of the Hadejia-Jama'are-Komadugu-Yobe Basin Trust Fund, advised that any decision should be deferred until the Environmental Impact Assessment on the project had been completed.
In September 2009, three farmers’ associations in downstream Borno State called for the federal government and Bauchi State government to shelve the project, concerned about the impact on their livelihood.
In August 2009, Senator Ahmed Ibrahim Lawan of Yobe North, Chairman of the Senate Committee on Public Accounts, spoke against the proposed dam. He stated that the Tiga and Challawa dams on the Hadejia River had already reduced downstream water flow drastically, and the Jama'are River was now the main source of water in the Yobe River. He said the dams caused intense poverty, increased desert encroachment, migration and conflicts between arable farmers and herdsmen.

See also
Hadejia-Nguru wetlands

References

Dams in Nigeria
Bauchi State
Yobe State
Proposed hydroelectric power stations
Proposed renewable energy power stations in Nigeria